Blossoming Chestnut Branches was painted by Vincent van Gogh during the artist's Auvers-sur-Oise period in May 1890, the final year of his life.

The painting was one of four missing after a high-profile theft from the Foundation E.G. Bührle gallery in Zürich on February 10, 2008. The work was found nine days later in a parked automobile in Zürich, along with one of the other stolen paintings, and was returned undamaged to the gallery.

See also
List of works by Vincent van Gogh

References

External links 
 

Paintings by Vincent van Gogh
Paintings of Auvers-sur-Oise by Vincent van Gogh
Paintings in the Foundation E. G. Bührle Collection
Stolen works of art
1890 paintings